Kensington Metropark is a unit of the Huron–Clinton Metroparks system located between Milford and South Lyon, Michigan, USA. The park covers 4,543 acres (18.13 km2). It has wooded hilly terrain and surrounds  Kent Lake (a dammed section of the Huron River). The park has an 18-hole regulation golf course, a disc golf course, toboggan hill, a nature center, a farm learning center, picnic areas, beaches, splash pad with water slide and boat rentals. The only camping is in organized group camping or canoe-in sites. The park receives 2.5 million visitors a year. Kensington Metropark opened in 1947.

Gallery

References

External links

 Huron-Clinton Metroparks

Huron–Clinton Metroparks
Huron River (Michigan)
Protected areas of Oakland County, Michigan
Nature centers in Michigan
Museums in Oakland County, Michigan
Farm museums in Michigan